David Kenneth Miles  (born 1959) is a British economist.  Born in Swansea, he has spent his working life in London, in teaching, business and the public sector. He is a professor at Imperial College London, and was Chief UK Economist of Morgan Stanley bank from October 2004 to May 2009. He was appointed to the Bank of England's interest-rate-setting Monetary Policy Committee (MPC) from 1 June 2009 to June 2012 and again from June 2012 to 31 August 2015, before being replaced by Gertjan Vlieghe. According to the Bank of England, "As an economist he has focused on the interaction between financial markets and the wider economy.". In December 2020 he was appointed to the main board ("The Commission") of the central Bank of Ireland. He was appointed to the Budget Responsibility Committee of the Office for Budget Responsibility (OBR) in December 2021. He took up that role in January 2022.

Miles was born in 1959, and was educated at the Bishop Gore School in Swansea, University College, Oxford, Nuffield College, Oxford, and the London School of Economics.

In 2003 Miles produced a report for the British Chancellor of the Exchequer to examine why the long-term fixed rate mortgage market is not as popular a product in Britain as in other countries. His report states: "A great many borrowers focus on the initial cost of debt and do not seem to consider carefully how those payments might change relative to their incomes". Much of Miles's  academic research has focused on housing, pensions, monetary policy, asset pricing and ways to make the financial system more stable.

From 2004 to 2009 Miles was Chief UK Economist of Morgan Stanley bank.

Miles predicted a substantial fall in real house prices in November 2006.

In 2009 he was asked, along with Gerald Holtham and Professor Berndt Spahn, to serve on a Commission established by the Welsh Assembly Government to investigate the scope for the Welsh Assembly to have greater fiscal autonomy. The Holtham Commission reported in July 2010.

From June 2009 to August 2015 Miles served on the Bank of England's Monetary Policy Committee.  In 2011 he published a detailed study of the appropriate balance sheet structure of banks to avoid a repeat of the financial crisis ("Optimal Bank Capital"). He concluded that the Basel III agreements on capital requirements for banks set the standard for equity at only about half its appropriate level.  In 2012 he began a second term with the Monetary Policy Committee.

He was President of the economics section of the British Science Association (BSA) for 2015. He was appointed Commander of the Order of the British Empire (CBE) in the 2016 New Year Honours for services to monetary policy.

In 2016 he was appointed by Her Majesty's Treasury to advise on the measurement and reporting of yields on UK government debt. His report was completed in October 2016 and is being implemented.  
He was Chair of the board of trustees of the Institute for Fiscal Studies until December 2021 when he took up his position at the OBR. He is a trustee of the Centre for Economic Policy Research. 

A keen scrum half in his youth, Miles also gained fame as the top try scorer in the South Wales regional league season 1976–77.

Bibliography

References

External links
 Miles Report: Part 1
 Miles Report: Part 2
 Miles Report: Part 3
 Call for more long-term mortgages BBC News, 9 December 2003

British economists
Academics of Imperial College London
Living people
People from Swansea
People educated at Bishop Gore School
1959 births
Commanders of the Order of the British Empire
Alumni of University College, Oxford
Alumni of Nuffield College, Oxford